The California Hall of Fame honors individuals and families who embody California's innovative spirit and have made their mark on history. The hall and its exhibits are housed in The California Museum in Sacramento.

The hall of fame was conceived by then–California First Lady Maria Shriver, who asked her friend artist Robert Graham to design and fabricate the award. Graham was inducted in 2008, the same award is being given today. It opened in 2006 with 13 charter enshrinees.

Among the requirements, all inductees must have been a resident of California for at least five years. Furthermore, through their work and accomplishments, they should embody the spirit of California and the California Dream while also making a lasting, significant contribution to the state, nation and the world; and have inspired others to further their own dreams.

Inductees

Class of 2006

 César Chávez
 Walt Disney
 Amelia Earhart
 Clint Eastwood
 Frank Gehry
 Hearst family
 David D. Ho, M.D.
 Billie Jean King
 John Muir
 David and Lucile Packard
 Ronald Reagan
 Sally K. Ride
 Alice Walker

Class of 2007

 Ansel Adams
 Milton Berle
 Steve Jobs
 Willie Mays
 Robert Mondavi
 Rita Moreno
 Jackie Robinson
 Jonas Salk, M.D.
 John Steinbeck
 Elizabeth Taylor
 Earl Warren
 John Wayne
 Tiger Woods

Class of 2008

 Dave Brubeck
 Jane Fonda
 Theodor Geisel (Dr. Seuss)
 Robert Graham
 Quincy Jones
 Jack LaLanne
 Dorothea Lange
 Julia Morgan
 Jack Nicholson
 Linus Pauling
 Leland Stanford
 Alice Waters

Class of 2009

 Carol Burnett
 Andrew Grove
 Hiram Johnson
 Rafer Johnson
 Henry J. Kaiser
 Joan Kroc
 George Lucas
 John Madden
 Harvey Milk
 Fritz Scholder
 Danielle Steel
 Joe Weider
 Chuck Yeager

Class of 2010

 Pat Brown
 James Cameron
 John Doerr
 A.P. Giannini
 Merle Haggard
 Anne Lamott
 George Shultz
 Kevin Starr
 Levi Strauss
 Barbra Streisand
 Wayne Thiebaud
 Betty White
 Serena Williams
 Mark Zuckerberg

Class of 2011

 Buzz Aldrin
 The Beach Boys
 Elizabeth Blackburn
 Father Gregory Boyle
 Doris and Donald Fisher
 Magic Johnson
 Ed Roberts
 Carlos Santana
 Amy Tan
 Roger Traynor

Class of 2012

 Gregory Bateson
 Warren Beatty
 Charles and Ray Eames
 Dolores Huerta
 Ishi
 Joe Montana
 The Warner Brothers: Harry, Albert, Sam, and Jack L. Warner

Class of 2014

 Kareem Abdul-Jabbar
 Charlotta Bass
 Francis Ford Coppola
 Joan Didion
 Fred Ross
 Stephen Schneider
 Mimi Silbert
 Dr. Dre and Jimmy Iovine

Class of 2015

 Kristi Yamaguchi
 Robert Downey Jr.
 Bruce Lee
 David Hockney
 Buck Owens
 Lester Holt
 Ellen Ochoa
 Charles Schultz

Class of 2016

 Isabel Allende
 Harrison Ford
 Tony Gwynn
 Corita Kent
 William J. Perry
 Maria Shriver
 Russ Solomon
 George Takei

Class of 2017

 Lucille Ball
 Susan Desmond-Hellmann
 Mabel McKay
 Mario J. Molina
 Jim Plunkett
 Gary Snyder
 Steven Spielberg
 Michael Tilson Thomas
 Warren Winiarski

Class of 2018

 Joan Baez
 Arlene Blum
 Belva Davis
 Thomas Keller
 Ed Lee
 Nancy McFadden
 Robert Redford
 Fernando Valenzuela

Class of 2019

 Maya Angelou
 France A. Cordova
 RuPaul Andre Charles
 Helen M. Turley
 Brandi Chastain
 Wolfgang Puck
 Jeanne Wakatsuki Houston
 James M. Lawson, Jr.
 George Lopez
 Tony Hawk

Class of 2021

 Ruth Asawa
 Jerry Garcia
 Larry Itliong
 Del Martin and Phyllis Lyon
 Ritchie Valens

Class of 2022

 Lynda Carter
 Roy Choi
 Steven Chu
 Peggy Fleming
 Arlie Russell Hochschild
 Alonzo King
 Barbara Morgan
 Megan Rapinoe
 Linda Ronstadt
 Los Tigres del Norte
 Ed Ruscha

References

External links
California Hall of Fame
The California Museum for History, Women, and the Arts

Museums in Sacramento, California
Halls of fame in California
State halls of fame in the United States
Biographical museums in California
History of California
History museums in California
2006 establishments in California
Museums established in 2006